Do Jamilan (also Romanized as Do Jamīlān; also known as Do Jambīlān, Dojembīlān, and Dowjamīrān) is a village in Sirik Rural District, Byaban District, Minab County, Hormozgan Province, Iran. At the 2006 census, its population was 121, in 23 families.

References 

Populated places in Minab County